This is a list of mines in Temagami, a municipality in the northern part of Nipissing District in Northeastern Ontario, Canada. Also included are their alias names, coordinates, workings and the commodities that were mined there. The list contains 32 mines, both surface and underground. They are located in 12 geographic townships, with Strathy Township having the largest mine capacity.

Mining is a significant part of Temagami's history. The municipality was the scene of active prospecting and mining ventures throughout most of the 20th century, resulting in the creation of trenches, open cuts, open pits, adits, shafts and drifts in the regional bedrock. Commodities extracted from these mines included iron, copper, nickel, gold, arsenic, molybdenum, platinum, palladium, lead, silver, cobalt, zinc, bismuth, uranium, graphite and pyrite.

The mines of Temagami are situated in a variety of geological formations. This includes the Nipissing diabase and Temagami greenstone belt, which hosts a variety of mineral deposits. Mining in these two geological features began in the early 1900s with the discovery of precious metals, such as gold and silver.

Strathy Township

Best Township

Belfast Township

Cassels Township

Mining in Cassels Township dates from 1900 when the area was being explored for silver and cobalt. This work was carried out by Temagami-Lorrain Mining Limited in the Sauvé Lake area and Temagami-Cobalt Mining Company Limited in the Gosselin Lake area. Trenches and shafts were constructed in Nipissing diabase along with rock stripping. This work was in the Outlet Bay area of Net Lake.

Vogt Township

Phyllis Township

Clement Township

Cynthia Township

Joan Township

Scholes Township

Strathcona Township

Torrington Township

See also
List of mines in Ontario

References

Mines in Temagami
Temagami